Pui Pui Protection Forest is a protected area in Junín, Peru, established on 31 January 1985.

See also 

 Pristimantis ashaninka

References 

National forests of Peru